44th CAS Awards
February 16, 2008

Theatrical Releases: 
No Country for Old Men

The 44th Cinema Audio Society Awards, which were held on February 16, 2008, honored the outstanding achievements in sound mixing in film and television of 2007.

Winners and nominees

Film
 No Country for Old Men
 300
 The Bourne Ultimatum
 Into the Wild
 Transformers

Television

Series
 CSI: Crime Scene Investigation (Episode: "Living Doll") 24 (Episode: "10:00 p.m. – 11:00 p.m.")
 Jericho (Episode: "Why We Fight")
 Scrubs (Episode: "My Musical")
 The Sopranos (Episode: "The Blue Comet")

Miniseries or Television Film
 Bury My Heart at Wounded Knee
 The Company (Episode: "Part 2")
 High School Musical 2
 The Kill Point (Episode: "The Great Ape Escape")
 Tin Man (Episode: "Into the Storm")

References

2007 film awards
2007 television awards
2007 guild awards
Cinema Audio Society Awards
2008 in American cinema